The Workers Revolutionary Party is a Trotskyist group in Britain once led by Gerry Healy. In the mid-1980s, it split into several smaller groups, one of which retains possession of the name.

The Club
The WRP grew out of the faction Gerry Healy and John Lawrence led in the Revolutionary Communist Party which urged that the RCP pursue entryist tactics in the Labour Party. This policy was also urged on the RCP by the leadership of the Fourth International. When the majority in the RCP rejected the policy in 1947, Healy's faction was granted the right to split from the RCP and work within the Labour Party as a separate body known internally as The Club. A year later the majority faction of the RCP decided to join The Club in the Labour Party.

Healy called for a massive educational effort within the organisation, which angered the old leadership. Though he met with opposition, Healy valued having a well-educated cadre over a large number of mindless followers. Healy set to work purging the group of real and imagined opponents with the result that within months the organisation was a fraction of its former size, but Healy's leadership was unchallenged.

In 1948, The Club joined with Labour left-wingers and trade unionists to organise The Socialist Fellowship as a vehicle for left-wing Labour Party members. The Socialist Fellowship launched a paper called Socialist Outlook, with John Lawrence as the publication's editor. When the International Committee of the Fourth International (ICFI) was founded as a public faction of the Fourth International in 1953, it recognised The Club as its official British section. However, Lawrence objected to this and as a result was replaced as editor of the paper. Healy took over editorial duties, but Socialist Outlook was proscribed by the Labour Party in 1954, while the Socialist Fellowship itself was proscribed by Labour in 1951. After this, The Club distributed Tribune.

The Club was one of the ICFI's larger segments. After the American, Austrian, Chinese, Latin American and Swiss parties of the ICFI agreed to reunification with the FI in 1963 (forming the reunified Fourth International), The Club controlled the ICFI until its fragmentation in 1985.

The group gained recruits from among former members of the Communist Party of Great Britain. One of their recruits from the CPGB was Peter Fryer, who had been the Daily Worker's correspondent in Budapest during the suppression of the uprising by Soviet troops, and who edited The Newsletter, a weekly which began publication in May 1958. This paper published some of Trotsky's then hard-to-find books. Among other recruits at this time were Cliff Slaughter and Brian Pearce. Coupled with pressure from a group around industrial activist Brian Behan led to the formation of  the Socialist Labour League.

Socialist Labour League

Proscribed by the Labour Party
For the first time, the Socialist Labour League was openly Trotskyist, although most of its members remained active in the Labour Party. The foundation of the SLL was formally announced at the end of February 1959, Membership was "open to all who want to see the vigorous prosecution of the class struggle and the achievement of working class power".

The group's Newsletter, and the SLL itself, were proscribed by the Labour Party in late March 1959, which meant that anyone associated with Healy's group became ineligible for membership of the Labour Party. Morgan Phillips, then general secretary of the Labour Party, addressed the issue of SLL entryism. "The principal group is so well disciplined and financed that it is slowly emerging as a serious nuisance to the democratic Socialism which it outwardly accepts and covertly derides", he wrote in an April 1959 letter to the secretaries of Constituency Labour Parties and affiliated trade unions. By August, 23 people associated with the SLL in the Norwood Constituency Labour Party and eight councillors in Leeds, among others, had been expelled by Labour. As a result of the activities  of the SLL activists in Norwood, the local Labour Party branch was re-organised later in the year. Meanwhile, J.R. Campbell, by then the former editor of the Daily Worker, wrote in the Communist weekly World News in October 1959 that the SLL was an "anti-Soviet league" and "a disruptive, Trotskyist organisation", who were in favour of the overthrow of the Soviet government by an unaffiliated working class inside and outside the Soviet Union.

Later history
During this period, the SLL did experience considerable internal tensions. Fryer left in 1959 and in 1960 a group of members split away to form Solidarity, which became a theoretically influential, industrially oriented organisation strongly influenced by the ideas of Paul Cardan. Brian Behan also severed his involvement with the group after a confrontation with Gerry Healy.

The SLL remained active in the Labour Party's youth organisation, the Young Socialists, and gained control of it until the YS was wound up in 1964. The SLL used the YS as their own youth section. It was run through the "centre" in Clapham, the SLL's HQ, in a doctrinaire and almost militaristic fashion. The Annual Conferences of the YS were stage managed by the Healyites. The Labour Party renamed the youth section  the "Labour Party Young Socialists"  (LPYS).

The SLL leadership claimed in 1963 that they had identified a revolutionary situation in Britain. In their view this meant the most important activity was building the party. They started a daily paper, Workers Press, in the early 1970s and increased the turnover of membership, and began to fear police infiltration. Internal and external dissidents were dealt with harshly. One incident saw Ernie Tate, a Canadian Trotskyist, attacked in public while distributing anti-Healy leaflets. The advocacy of an increasing state of crisis would become a prominent part of their public profile.

In order to "kill the bill" which became the Industrial Relations Act 1971, the SLL called for a general strike to force the government of  Edward Heath to call a general election. While a SLL-organised meeting at the Alexandra Palace, London in February 1971 had an attendance of 4,000, the SLL and the other Trotskyist groups had a very limited industrial presence incapable of organising such a level of protest, according to a contemporary report by Paul Routledge in The Times.

Workers Revolutionary Party
The WRP formed the All-Trade Unions Alliance, which it wholly controlled. Among its policies was the immediate replacement of the police by a workers militia. The party slowly lost members from the mid-1970s as demands on members to serve the organisation took their toll, although by now Corin and Vanessa Redgrave had joined.

A major split occurred when Alan Thornett was expelled, and went on to found the Workers Socialist League. In 1979, a smaller group split from the WRP to found the Workers Party.

In 1975, Corin Redgrave bought the White Meadows Villa in Parwich, Derbyshire, and the WRP used the house as a venue for training, under the name 'Red House', run by television director Roy Battersby. The Observer printed a report alleging that actress Irene Gorst was interrogated while at the school and prevented from leaving. The group sued Observer editor David Astor over the report, in a case marked by discussion of an armed police raid of the building in which bullets were found. The jury found that not all words in the article were substantially true, but that the complainants' reputations had not been materially injured.

In 1976, the WRP launched an inquiry into the details of Trotsky's death, following claims from Joseph Hansen that Harold Robins, a founding member of the American Socialist Workers Party might have been a Soviet agent. The eventual report exonerated Robins and claimed that Ramón Mercader was alive in Czechoslovakia. In 1979, the group purchased Trotsky's death mask to use as an iconic focus for events.

The WRP met with Libyan officials in 1977 and issued a joint statement, opposing Zionism, U.S. imperialism and Anwar Sadat. There were immediate suggestions that this statement might be linked to Libyan funding for the party's newspaper, News Line. Close links continued, with party members regularly speaking at official events in Libya. In 1981, The Sunday Telegraph alleged that News Line was financed by money from Muammar al-Gaddafi's government. In 1983, The Money Programme made similar claims, which were repeated by the Socialist Organiser newspaper. While the WRP initially chose to sue, it quickly abandoned the case. When, a little later, the WRP disintegrated, an investigation was carried out by the leadership of the ICFI, with the support of Mike Banda and Cliff Slaughter, leading figures in the WRP. The report concluded that the WRP had collected information for Libyan Intelligence. As printed by Solidarity, the report claimed £1,075,163 had been received by the group from Libya and several Middle Eastern governments, between 1977 and 1983. While only a small proportion of this is alleged to have come from Saddam Hussein's Iraqi government, it draws particular attention to photographs which it claims WRP members were instructed to take of demonstrations of opponents of Saddam Hussein, and it states that those photos were later handed to the Iraqi embassy. Dave Bruce, who oversaw the printing press, claims that income from Libya mostly covered the cost of raw materials for printing work for them, including copies of The Green Book, and that the party could otherwise cover its own costs.

The group also set up youth training centres in various deprived communities across Britain. Liberal Party MP David Alton claimed in Parliament that youths were being taught anti-police methods at the centres, and when he repeated the allegations outside Parliament was sued by the WRP.

Gerry Healy expelled

In late October 1985, the Workers Revolutionary Party expelled Gerry Healy. Other expulsions, including those of Vanessa and Corin Redgrave, soon followed. Initially, Healy was accused of "non-communist relations". Shortly afterwards, a Newsline front page open letter by Aileen Jennings, Healy's former secretary, asserted that the real reason for the expulsion was that Healy had sexually assaulted at least 26 female members. Some of these allegations were confirmed by an internal party investigation. This was conducted by two long-standing members of the WRP, one of whom later published the control commission report in his memoirs.

There was a  counter-claim that the expulsion had been motivated by a failed political coup attempted by party general secretary Michael Banda. "This is part of a political frame-up by Mr Banda who wants to dissolve the WRP because he has moved to the right", asserted Vanessa Redgrave, who also said at this time that Healy's accusers were "liars". Banda was the leader of the majority on the party council, and was accused by Healy and Vanessa Redgrave of "unprincipled and unsupportable" deviation from the Trotskyist road to Socialism.

Fragmentation and continuation

Healy and his followers continued to claim to be the WRP, and for a time two versions of the group were in existence, each publishing its own daily News Line paper. The split in the WRP also had repercussions in the ICFI and as a result there were also two versions of that organisation.

The two versions of the WRP soon became known by their newspapers, with the group led by Gerry Healy and Sheila Torrance being known as the WRP (Newsline). The group led by Cliff Slaughter expelled Banda, and became known as the WRP (Workers Press). Both groups fragmented further over the following years.

The first split in Healy's WRP (Newsline) came when a section of the London membership around full-timer Richard Price revolted and were expelled in due course. They formed the Workers International League in 1987, which later evolved into Workers Action and away from the Healyism it defended when first founded. 

Another split in the pro-Healy ICFI and WRP developed when the American section of the ICFI led by Workers League National Secretary David North revolted against Healy's leadership and split to form its own rival movement also called the ICFI. Some members of the WRP sympathetic to North, led by David Hyland, left the WRP in 1986 to form the International Communist Party, based in Sheffield. This grouping has since been renamed the Socialist Equality Party.

In 1986, the ICFI loyal to Healy expelled the WRP (Newsline). Healy was removed from the group's Central Committee and became an advisor. When the organisation printed an article reviewing Healy's contribution to Trotskyism, he concluded that his forced retirement was being finalised. With Corin and Vanessa Redgrave, he formed a minority tendency which called for a more pro-Soviet alignment, and split away in 1987 to form the Marxist Party. The Marxist Party in turn experienced another small split after Healy's death which formed the Communist League. The Marxist Party continued until 2004 before dissolving itself, with the Redgraves then forming the Peace and Progress Party.

The WRP (Workers Press) suffered a series of further splits – including the International Socialist League and supporters of the Workers International to Rebuild the Fourth International – and ended as a tiny organisation known as the Movement for Socialism.

Torrance's WRP is the only surviving Workers Revolutionary Party in the UK and still produces The News Line as a daily paper, and it is also included in a website. The party has been registered with the Electoral Commission since 15 May 2001, with Frank Sweeney as registered leader. As of 2007, the WRP had assets of just over £4,000. It remains electorally active and stood seven candidates for the 2015 UK General Election, six in London and one in Sheffield, gaining a total of 488 votes. It supported Brexit in the 2016 referendum. In 2019, the WRP announced their intention to stand six candidates in the 2019 United Kingdom general election.

Election results

House of Commons
WRP endorsed Labour in constituencies they were not contesting in the 2019 United Kingdom general election.

Splits
 Solidarity (1960).
 Workers Socialist League (1974), later the International Socialist Group and currently Socialist Resistance.
 Workers Party (1979), currently 'Economic and Philosophic Science Review Supporters'.
 WRP (Workers Press) (1985), later the Movement for Socialism.
 Workers' International League (1985), later 'Workers Action'.
 International Communist Party (1986), currently the Socialist Equality Party.
 Communist Forum (1986), split from WRP (Workers Press); later the 'Marxist Philosophy Forum'.
 Marxist Party (1987).
 International Socialist League (1988), split from WRP (Workers Press).
 Communist League (1990), split from Marxist Party; later the 'Movement for a Socialist Future' and now "A World to Win".

Further reading

Articles
 Hallas, Duncan. Cult comes a cropper, 1985.
 Healy, Gerry. Some Reflections on the Socialist Labour League. From the March 1960 issue of SLL internal bulletin "Forum"; reprinted by What Next Journal.
 Higgins, Jim. Suppose He Had Been Enthusiastic: Review of Harry Ratner, Reluctant Revolutionary. A review of a memoir of the Socialist Labour League. New Interventions, 1995.
 North, David. How the Workers Revolutionary Party Betrayed Trotskyism 1973–1985 , 1986.
 Price, Richard. Healy's WRP: The Inside Story A review of Alex Mitchell's autobiography, 2012.
 John Sullivan "Will the real WRP please stand up?" in As Soon As This Pub Closes, 1988.
 Thornett, Alan. The Ceausescu of the British Trotskyist Movement Gerry Healy obituary, Socialist Outlook, 1990.

Books
 Cowen, Clare. My Search for Revolution: & How we brought down an abusive leader, (2019: Leicester, Troubador), 
 Downing, Gerry. WRP Exposion, 1991
 Lotz, Corinna. Feldman, Paul. Gerry Healy: A Revolutionary Life, (1994: London, Lupus Books), 
 Harding, Norman. Staying Red: Why I Remain a Socialist, (2005: London, Index Books), 
 Mitchell, Alex. Come the Revolution. (2011: Sydney, NewSouth Publishing, 
 Pitt, Bob. The Rise and Fall of Gerry Healy, 2002

External links
 Workers Revolutionary Party (Newsline) Website
 WRP election flyer for party candidate Deon Gayle (Streatham) in the run up for the parliamentary election on 7 May 2015
 Catalogue of the SLL/WRP papers within Tony Whelan's papers, held at the Modern Records Centre, University of Warwick
 Catalogue of the Talbot SLL/WRP papers, held at the Modern Records Centre, University of Warwick

References